2019 Pakistan Super League (also known as PSL 4 or for sponsorship reasons HBL PSL 2019) was the fourth season of the Pakistan Super League, a franchise Twenty20 cricket league which was established by the Pakistan Cricket Board (PCB) in 2015. The tournament took place from 14 February to 17 March 2019.

In the championship game, Quetta Gladiators defeated Peshawar Zalmi by eight wickets in Karachi to win the title for the first time. Mohammad Hasnain of Quetta was named the Man of the Match of the Final. Shane Watson, also of Quetta, was awarded the Player of the Tournament award and the leading run scorer award with a total of 435 runs in the tournament. Hasan Ali of Peshawar was awarded the leading wicket taker award with a total of 25 wickets.

Background
On 10 November 2018, PCB terminated franchise agreements with the owner of Multan Sultans, Schön Properties. Ali Khan Tareen later became the new owner of the team. On 14 November, PCB announced that HBL has renewed its partnership with PSL for 3 more years until 2021.

Broadcasting partners
The broadcasting rights of the 4th season of PSL were given to various Sports channels for covering the event in different countries. The broadcasting rights of the season in Pakistan were given to leading sports channels, PTV Sports & Geo Super, whereas in United States and Canada the rights were given to Willow TV. Hum TV was given the rights to broadcast the series in UK & Europe. The OTT rights for Middle-Eastern and North Africa Countries were given to Cricketgateway.

In case of India the broadcasting rights were given to DSports which partnered with Daily Fantasy Site, MyTeam11, to co-present PSL in India.

Teams and squads

Each franchise retained up to 10 players during the trade and retention window that started on 29 September. A squad of 16 players, with 4 supplementary players, was then completed in players draft held at Islamabad on 20 November. On 16 December 2018, PSL announced that each team will have additional budget to select 21-member squad. The replacement draft was held on 24 January in Lahore.

Venues
On 12 June 2018, the franchises and PCB officials in a meeting decided against the idea of having a full PSL fourth edition in Pakistan. The new PCB chairman Ehsan Mani announced on 15 September that tournament was to start from 14 February 2019 in UAE, and the last eight games were to be held in Pakistan along with the final that will be played on 17 March in Karachi.

For the first time, four PSL matches were played in Abu Dhabi.

Originally, three matches were scheduled to be played in Lahore but due to logistical and operational challenges posed by the delayed opening of Lahore airspace for commercial flights following military tensions between Pakistan and India, the matches were shifted to Karachi. Mani said that PCB had made a critical decision and the "headquarters of Pakistan cricket will be unable to host" 2019 PSL matches.

Match officials

Umpires

Faisal Afridi
Michael Gough
Richard Illingworth
Ranmore Martinesz
Tariq Rasheed
Ahsan Raza
Shozab Raza
Rashid Riaz
Asif Yaqoob

Referees
 Mohammad Anees
Muhammad Javed
Roshan Mahanama

Promotion in media
The league was promoted on social media by the hashtag #HBLPSL due to its title sponsor, and by its official anthem #KhelDeewanoKa.

Ceremonies

Opening ceremony
The opening ceremony was held on 14 February at Dubai International Cricket Stadium, prior to the first match of the season. It was started by the national anthems of UAE "Ishy Bilady", and of Pakistan "Qaumi Taranah" as usual. It then featured a marching band, which performed Europe's "The Final Countdown". Then, British singer Marcia Barrett, from German band Boney M., performed her band's song "Daddy Cool". Aima Baig and Shuja Haider performed on their rendition of Nazia Hassan and Zohaib Hassan's "Disco Deewane". Then members of Junoon band performed on their "Yaar Bina", "Heerey" and "Jazba-e-Junoon". The last performance included title anthem of the league's fourth season by Fawad Khan featuring Young Desi. Then, melody of Ali Zafar's previous anthems for PSL was played, followed by fireworks.

A list of artists to perform at the ceremony was officially released on 18 January, according to which American rapper Pitbull was also confirmed to perform, however, later he withdrew due to a technical fault in his plane's engine.

Closing ceremony
The closing ceremony of the league, hosted by Fakhar-e-Alam, was held at National Stadium, Karachi, on 17 March prior to the league's final match. One minute silence was observed in respect of the martyrs of Christchurch mosque shootings.

Then Abrar-ul-Haq performed his song "Nach Majajan". Aima Baig and Shuja Haider once again paid tribute to Nazia Hassan by performing "Dosti" and "Disco Deewane". Fawad Khan featuring Young Desi performed the title anthem of the league's fourth season. Sahir Ali Bagga then performed a patriotic song "Har Dil Ki Awaz". Last performance was by Junoon, who sang "Zamaane Ke Andaaz", "Khudi Ko Kar Buland", "Sayonee" and "Dil Dil Pakistan".

The Chief Minister of Sindh, Syed Murad Ali Shah, Spanish World Cup winning footballer Carles Puyol and the cast of the upcoming Pakistani film The Legend of Maula Jatt also appeared at the ceremony. Army Chief Gen. Qamar Javed Bajwa and Governor Sindh Imran Ismail also attended the final match.

Cancer awareness
International Child Hood Cancer Awareness Day was observed on 15 February with golden ribbon as a theme, while Breast Cancer Awareness Day was observed on 10 March with pink ribbon as a theme. The stadiums were also themed respectively.

League stage

Format
The six teams all played 10 matches each and got 2 points for every win, none for a loss and 1 point for a no result. The top four teams in the group stage qualified for the play-offs.

Points table

Summary

League progression

Fixtures
The complete fixture schedule was released on 13 December 2018. On 3 March 2019, the updated schedule for Pakistan round was released.

 Peshawar Zalmi's score of 20 at the end of the powerplay equalled the record low total

Playoffs

Qualifier

Eliminators

Eliminator 1

Eliminator 2

Final

Awards and statistics

Most runs

  Shane Watson of Quetta Gladiators received the Green Cap.

Most wickets

  Hasan Ali of Peshawar Zalmi received the Maroon Cap.

See also
 Islamabad United in 2019
 Karachi Kings in 2019
 Lahore Qalandars in 2019
 Multan Sultans in 2019
 Peshawar Zalmi in 2019
 Quetta Gladiators in 2019

Notes

References

External links
 
 Official partner

 
Domestic cricket competitions in 2018–19
2019 in Emirati cricket
2019 in Pakistani cricket
2019 in Sindh
2010s in Dubai
2010s in Karachi
21st century in Abu Dhabi
Cricket in Karachi
February 2019 sports events in Pakistan
History of the Emirate of Sharjah
March 2019 sports events in Pakistan
Sport in Abu Dhabi
Sport in Dubai
Sport in Sharjah (city)